Margaret Winifred Vowles (née Pearce; 4 January 1882, Gloucester – 4 March 1932, Kingston) was an English author on science.

Parentage

She was the daughter of Francis Tring Pearce (16 Mar 1846  – 19 May 1935) and Martha Allen of Lorraine House, Gloucester, England.  FT Pearce was a director of Priday, Metford and Company Limited millers of Gloucester and he was the son of Maria Tring (died 19 October 1853) and Thomas Pearce (died 13 January 1895).  Thomas Pearce owned a Chemist at 134 Westgate Street, Gloucester from 1841 to 1870. Thomas Pearce was the son of Joseph Pearce (died 7 July 1847 at Birlingham, Worcestershire, a "yeoman").

Her maternal grandfather was Henry Allen who was Mayor of Gloucester in 1873.

Education

She took a Bachelor of Science Degree from the University of London for which she studied at Cheltenham Ladies' College.  She became a member of the History of Science Society and the Women's Engineering Society.  Prior to her death she had been living in Wimbledon for two years and was a member of the local branch of the Women Citizen's Association.  She published one book and a number of articles on science with her husband Hugh Pembroke Vowles.

Golf

She was a keen golfer and played for both Gloucestershire and Glamorganshire.  Her golfing achievements included winning the Midland Counties' Championship and the Radyr Ladies' Cup competition.  Whilst living in Wales, she won the latter competition and set a course record.  Whilst playing for the Glamorgan County Ladies' Club she won the County Cup and the Coronation Medal.

Siblings

She was member of the Pearce family who co-owned Priday, Metford and Company Limited for six generations.

Her siblings were:

 Charlotte Mary Pearce (17 Jul 1872  – 24 October 1948) married Hubert Cecil Booth, inventor of the powered vacuum cleaner
 Henry Allen Pearce (15 Oct 1873  – 12 November 1931) married Mary Yeoman Hardinge Vowles (1879–1960) In the 1901 census, Henry Allen Pearce is noted as a miller.
 Francis Thomas Pearce (10 May 1875  – 17 February 1964) married Rose Marianne Parmenter
 Helen Marion Louisa Pearce (18 Jan 1877  – 7 November 1961) married Dr John Pottinger emigrated from England to New Zealand.  Believed to have adopted children there.
 Herbert Elliott Pearce (3 Feb 1880  – 14 March 1957) was injured with the Royal Flying Corps in the first world war and later owned the "Hobday and co" ironmonger store in Pimlico, on the corner of Moreton and Tachbrook streets.  He also published two books on poetry.
 Margaret Winifred Pearce (4 Jan 1882  – 4 March 1932)
 Edward Oscar Pearce (12 Sep 1885  – 31 August 1963) awarded an Order of the British Empire (military) in 1919 whilst a Captain (acting Major) in the Royal Engineers. His OBE was received for "valuable service rendered in connection with military operations in France".  He was also Mentioned in Dispatches by Field Marshal Sir Douglas Haig on 19 March 1919 for "gallant and distinguished services in the Field" and signed by Winston S Churchill.  Pearce used the name Oscar and is thought to have been a civil engineer who lived in India for a long while, retiring back to England.  He is buried in Benenden churchyard.

Gallery

Publications 

 The Quest for Power (Chapman and Hall, London, 1931 book published with Hugh Pembroke Vowles)
 Science and Industrial Insanity. Article published with Hugh Vowles. Date uncertain.

References

1882 births
1932 deaths
English writers
People educated at Cheltenham Ladies' College
Alumni of the University of London
People from Gloucester